Abu Rubays (also spelled Abu Rubeis or Abu Rbeis) is a Syrian village located in the Mahardah Subdistrict of the Mhardeh District in Hama Governorate.  According to the Syria Central Bureau of Statistics (CBS), Abu Rubays had a population of 619 in the 2004 census.

References 

Populated places in Mahardah District